Daniel T. Jones is an English author and researcher. He won the Shingo Prize for Operational Excellence in the Research and Professional Publication category multiple times for his books The Machine that Changed the World, Lean Thinking: Banish Waste and Create Wealth in Your Organization and Seeing the Whole: Mapping the Extended Value Stream.

He is also the founder of the Lean Enterprise Academy.

Education 
He has a bachelor's degree in economics from the University of Sussex. In 2015 he received an honorary Doctorate of Science from the University of Buckingham in the United Kingdom.

Works 
Daniel Jones along with James P. Womack researched the automotive industry. Their research work with Daniel Roos, a professor  at Massachusetts Institute of Technology on the automotive industry, found a three-to-one productivity difference between Japanese and American factories. Their research was published as a book, The Machine That Changed the World in 1991.

Bibliography

Books 
 
Roos, Daniel, Ph.D.; Womack, James P., Ph.D.; Jones, Daniel T.: The Machine That Changed the World : The Story of Lean Production, Harper Perennial (November 1991),

See also 

 Lean manufacturing

References 

20th-century English writers
Alumni of the University of Sussex
Living people
Year of birth missing (living people)